Ulukent (Laz language: Pilargeti (ფილარგეთი)) is a village in the Arhavi District, Artvin Province, Turkey. Its population is 169 (2021).

References

Villages in Arhavi District
Laz settlements in Turkey